Todd Diacon is an American college administrator and educator serving as the 13th President of Kent State University in Kent, Ohio (U.S.). He previously served as the provost and senior vice president of Kent State.

Education
Diacon received his B.A. degree from Southwestern College (Kansas), M.A., and Ph.D. from University of Wisconsin-Madison.

Career
Diacon served as an executive vice president and provost at Kent State University, deputy chancellor at the University of Massachusetts Amherst and Vice Provost at the University of Tennessee, Knoxville.

On April 28, 2019, Diacon was appointed the 13th president of Kent State, effective July 1, 2019.

References

Living people
Presidents of Kent State University
Southwestern College (Kansas) alumni
University of Wisconsin–Madison alumni
University of Tennessee faculty
University of Massachusetts Amherst faculty
People from Sumner County, Kansas
1959 births